Richard Vyvyan may refer to:

 Sir Richard Vyvyan, 1st Baronet (c. 1613–1665), Member of Parliament and Royalist during the English Civil War
 Sir Richard Vyvyan, 3rd Baronet (1681–1736), Member of Parliament and prominent Jacobite
 Sir Richard Vyvyan, 8th Baronet (1800–1879), Member of Parliament and Fellow of the Royal Society